Choi Ji-hyun (born March 9, 1994) is a South Korean short track speed skater.

Career
Choi won four distances and the overall classification at the 2010 World Junior Championships in Taipei. She was the first South Korean ever to win a gold medal in the women's 500 metres in the World Junior Championships.

External links
ISU profile

1994 births
Living people
South Korean female short track speed skaters
Yonsei University alumni
People from Cheongju
Universiade medalists in short track speed skating
Universiade gold medalists for South Korea
Competitors at the 2013 Winter Universiade
Sportspeople from North Chungcheong Province
21st-century South Korean women